Does Fort Worth Ever Cross Your Mind is the fourth studio album by American country music artist George Strait, released on September 26, 1984, by MCA Records. It is certified platinum by the RIAA for sales of one million copies in the U.S. The title track, "The Cowboy Rides Away", and "The Fireman" were all released as singles from this album. "Honky Tonk Saturday Night" was previously recorded by John Anderson on his 1982 album, Wild & Blue. American music critic Robert Christgau would refer the album as Strait’s best to date in his relative review.

Track listing

Personnel
 Eddie Bayers – drums
 Larry Byrom – electric guitar
 Hank DeVito – steel guitar
 Johnny Gimble – fiddle, mandolin
 John Hobbs – keyboards
 David Hungate – bass guitar
 Weldon Myrick  – steel guitar
 Randy Scruggs – acoustic guitar
 George Strait – lead vocals, background vocals
 Curtis Young – background vocals
 Reggie Young – electric guitar

Production
 Jeff Adamoff – art direction
 Jimmy Bowen – producer
 Mark Coddington – second recording engineer
 Dave Hassinger – first recording engineer
 Tim Kisch – second recording engineer
 Glenn Meadows – Mastering
 Jim Shea – photography
 George Strait – producer
 Steve Tillisch – first recording engineer
 Ron Treat – first recording engineer

Charts

Weekly charts

Year-end charts

References

1984 albums
George Strait albums
MCA Records albums
Albums produced by Jimmy Bowen